Worthing, a town with borough status in the English county of West Sussex, has 212 buildings with listed status. The town's development in the early 19th century coincided with nearby Brighton's rise as a famous, fashionable resort, and Worthing became a quiet seaside town with a large stock of Victorian buildings. Residential growth in the 20th century absorbed nearby villages, and older houses, churches and mansions became part of the borough. The Town and Country Planning Act 1947, an act of Parliament effective from 1948, introduced the concept of "listing" buildings of architectural and historical interest, and Worthing Borough Council nominated 90 buildings at that time. More have since been added, but others have been demolished. As of 2009, Worthing has three buildings of Grade I status, 11 listed at Grade II*, 196 of Grade II status and three at the equivalent Grade C.

In England, a building or structure is defined as "listed" when it is placed on a statutory register of buildings of "special architectural or historic interest" by the Secretary of State for Culture, Media and Sport, a Government department, in accordance with the Planning (Listed Buildings and Conservation Areas) Act 1990 (a successor to the 1947 act). English Heritage, a non-departmental public body, acts as an agency of this department to administer the process and advise the department on relevant issues. There are three grades of listing status. Grade I, the highest, is defined as being of "exceptional interest"; Grade II* is used for "particularly important buildings of more than special interest"; and Grade II, the lowest, is used for buildings of "special interest". Some Anglican churches are still graded according to an old system in which Grades A, B and C were equivalent to I, II* and II respectively.

History of listed buildings and conservation in Worthing
From its origins as a fishing village, Worthing grew into a seaside resort in the early 19th century on the strength of royal patronage, the positive effect of nearby Brighton, the excellent climate and new road links to London. Land was quickly sold for speculative developments such as Liverpool Terrace and Park Crescent, individual residences such as Beach House and Warwick House, attractions like the Theatre Royal and churches such as St Paul's and Christ Church. Until the postwar Labour government passed the Town and Country Planning Act in 1947, there was no official system governing the preservation of historically significant buildings, and the rapid expansion of the town from the late 19th century onwards resulted in urban decay affecting the old town centre and demands to allow the clearance of buildings considered "obsolete and derelict".

Historically, despite the limited protection offered by listed status, the borough has had a poor record on conserving buildings of historic interest; architectural historian Ian Nairn described it as an "exasperating town ... full of [architecturally] ignoble endings". A 1947 plan by Charles Cowles-Voysey proposing the complete demolition and redevelopment of central Worthing was never implemented, but piecemeal changes since then (especially during the 1960s) have had a similar effect in removing many historically significant buildings. Indifference on the part of residents has been suggested: the demolition in 1970 of the old Theatre Royal—described as a "very precious survival" five years earlier—went ahead with no opposition. A conservation society was formed in 1973—much later than in similar towns; despite low levels of public support, it successfully saved Beach House from demolition in the late 1970s.

Listed buildings demolished or lost to redevelopment in Worthing include the old rectory at Broadwater, West Tarring's original Church House, most of the Humphrys Almshouses, the old Theatre Royal and the adjacent Omega Cottage.

Houses and commercial buildings—in some cases converted to other uses—make up many of Worthing's listed buildings, and several churches also feature. Other structures with listed status include an ornate cast-iron lamp-post—the only survivor of more than 100 installed when Worthing first received electricity, and saved from demolition in 1975; a K6 telephone kiosk in the Steyne, a seafront square; an 18th-century dovecote on a site where one has existed since the 13th century; and a recent addition: a 1989 sculpture by Elisabeth Frink consisting of four gigantic male heads cast in bronze and set on a stuccoed loggia.

Delistings and anomalies
One of Worthing's earliest and most important hotels was Warne's Hotel. It was built as a five-house block called York Terrace in the 1820s, reputedly by John Rebecca. It was listed at Grade II on 11 October 1949. In the 1870s, the hotel was enlarged when an adjacent terrace of houses was taken over. This was listed separately, also at Grade II, on 21 May 1976. The hotel closed in 1985, and efforts to conserve it were thwarted when it was gutted by fire in 1987. Both parts of the building were demolished in 1992. The 1870s corner block was delisted (removed from the statutory list) on 19 October 1998, but the main block has not been officially delisted.

Most of the houses in Warwick Place, a short street leading off the Brighton Road, are listed, but No. 3 Warwick Place has lost its status. The three-storey cobbled flint building's structural features include a bay window and a cornice supported by a modillion. It was listed at Grade II on 21 May 1976 and delisted on 1 August 2000.

The town had an Odeon cinema between 1934 and 1988, when it was demolished. It stood at the head of Liverpool Terrace, and was built in the Art Deco style with a prominent belvedere. The 1,600-capacity building cost £40,700. It was listed at Grade II on 26 March 1987, after its closure, but was removed from the statutory list on 27 July 1987.

On Marine Parade, numbers 66 and 67—part of the former Trafalgar Terrace—were listed in 1974. The four-storey houses dated from the early 19th century, and were bow-fronted and stuccoed. They were subsequently demolished, and a modern block of flats now stands on the site. They have not been officially delisted.

St Mary's Farmhouse in Durrington had two attendant barns, which were listed separately from the house (along with its front garden wall) to reflect their architectural value as a group. After the farmhouse was damaged by arsonists in 1978, it was saved from threatened demolition, but the barns were knocked down. One lay diagonally across the southwest corner of the farmhouse grounds; it was built mainly of flint and had a hipped roof of thatch. The other, of similar materials but with a partly gabled roof with a weatherboarded exterior, stood south of the house. An adjacent outbuilding, with a pentice roof, was included in its listing. Despite their demolition, they have not been officially delisted.

English Heritage's former listing system for Anglican churches, in which Grades A, B and C were used instead of I, II* and II respectively, has not been eliminated completely. St Andrew's (central Worthing), St Botolph's and St George's Churches are graded C instead of II. St Mary's Church at Broadwater was originally listed at Grade B, but has since been upgraded to Grade I.

Castle Goring and its associated buildings are very close to the border with the neighbouring district of Arun. Castle Goring Lodge was incorrectly classified by English Heritage as being in the civil parish of Clapham in Arun, but Worthing Borough Council's more recently updated listed building register correctly identifies its location as Worthing.

Listed buildings

References

Notes

Bibliography
 
 
 
 
 
 
 
 
 

 
 
 

Listed buildings in West Sussex
Worthing
Buildings and structures in Worthing
Lists of listed buildings in West Sussex